Łukasz Kośmicki (born September 9, 1968) is a Polish cinematographer, screenwriter and director, known for Dom zły (The Dark House) and The Coldest Game.

Kośmicki received the Special Award at the 2019 Gdynia Film Festival for the spy film The Coldest Game, described as "exquisitely made genre cinema". The film was picked up by Netflix and is distributed internationally.

Career
Kośmicki's debut as a cinematographer was with Gry uliczne. He mentions how he tried to make that film "MTV-like" to distinguish it from typical films about the Communist era (he said the idea came from Krzysztof Krauze). However, in the case of Poznań '56, he made the visuals black and white and very "classic", in the spirit of the European cinema of the 1960s.

His directorial debut came with The Coldest Game (2019).

Film

Director
 The Coldest Game (2019); also screenwriter

Screenwriter
 Dom zły (The Dark House) (2009)

Cinematographer
 Battle of Warsaw 1920 (2011) - second unit; also directorial cooperation
 Haker (2002)
 Sezon na leszcza (2000)
 Billboard (1998)
 Gniew (1998)
 Poznań '56 (1996)
 Gry uliczne (1996)

Documentaries
 W sercu ukrył miasto (1999) - cinematographer
 Stan zapalny (1997) - cinematographer
 Departament IV (1996) - cinematographer

Television
 Diagnoza (2018-2019) - director
 Druga szansa (2016) - director
 Przepis na życie (2011-2013) - director
 Rodzinka.pl (2011-2012) - director
 W roli Boga (2010) - cinematographer
 Wieczór z lalką (1997) - cinematographer
 Drugie zabicie psa (1996) - cinematographer
 Król Mięsopust (1995) - cinematographer

Other works
Kośmicki has also directed TV commercials and worked as a director and/or cinematographer on various short films.

References

External links 

1968 births
Living people
Polish screenwriters
Polish cinematographers
Polish directors
People from Szamotuły